You Don't Come Close is a live EP by the Ramones, recorded in 1978, and released in 2001. The songs were recorded live when the band played the television show Musikladen in Bremen, Germany. As a bonus, the disc includes a music video for "Rockaway Beach".

Track listing
"Teenage Lobotomy"
"Blitzkrieg Bop"
"Don't Come Close"
"I Don't Care"
"She's The One"
"Sheena Is a Punk Rocker"
"Cretin Hop"
"Listen To My Heart"
"California Sun"
"I Don't Wanna Walk Around With You"
"Pinhead"
"Rockaway Beach" (Bonus music video)

References

Ramones live albums
2001 live albums